Historia tripartita or Tripartite History may refer to:

Historia tripartita of Cassiodorus and Epiphanius
Historia tripartita of Theodorus Lector
Historia tripartita of Anastasius Bibliothecarius
Historia tripartita of Bartholomew of Lucca